Lincoln Zephyr is a name used by various different Lincoln vehicles.

 Lincoln-Zephyr, a 1936–1942 line of mid-size luxury cars
 Lincoln MKZ, a 2005–2020 mid-size sedan, sold as the Zephyr from 2005 to 2006
 Lincoln Z, a 2022–present mid-size sedan built by Changan Ford, originally known as the Zephyr

See also
 Lincoln-Zephyr V12 engine, a 1936–1948 series of engines